Early general elections were held in Ecuador on 26 April 2009  following the approval of a new constitution in a referendum held on 28 September 2008. President Rafael Correa ran for his first term under the new constitution. The election was initially expected to be held in October 2010.

Among the candidates for President were current President Rafael Correa, supported by his PAIS Alliance and the Socialist Party; Álvaro Noboa ran under the banner of the PRIAN and had the support of the Social Christian Party (PSC) and the Christian Democratic Union. Former president Lucio Gutiérrez ran as the candidate of the January 21 Patriotic Society Party.

Preliminary results suggested that Correa had won reelection in the first round easily, surpassing 50% of the vote, followed by Gutiérrez coming in second with about 28% of the vote. Correa's came short of having an absolute majority in parliament.

In addition Correa became the first sitting president to be reelected since García Moreno since 1875.

The full results of the seat distribution was still known, though it was assumed that PAIS would have 59 seats, PSP 19, PSC/MG 11, PRIAN 7, MPD 5, the Municipalist Movement 5, and others less than 5 seats.

Opinion polls

Results

President

National Assembly

References 

2009 elections in South America
General election
Presidential elections in Ecuador
Election and referendum articles with incomplete results